North Baltimore Local School District is a school district in Northwest Ohio, United States. The school district serves students who live in the city of North Baltimore in Wood County. As of the 2006–2007 academic year, the school district enrolls 845 students. The superintendent is Ryan Delaney. The school is affiliated with Penta Career Center.

Grades 7–12
North Baltimore High School

Grades kindergarten–6
Powell Elementary

Pre kindergarten
Powell Preschool

References

External links
District Website

School districts in Wood County, Ohio
School districts established in 1927
1927 establishments in Ohio